Carlos Daniel Avilez Mojica (born January 9, 1999) is a professional footballer who plays as a goalkeeper for Chattanooga Red Wolves SC in USL League One. Born in the United States, he represented the Mexico national under-18 team.

Club career
On February 26, 2021, Avilez joined USL League One side South Georgia Tormenta FC.

Avilez signed with Chattanooga Red Wolves SC on January 17, 2022.

Honors
North Texas SC
USL League One Regular Season Title: 2019
USL League One Championship: 2019

References

External links
 
 Carlos Avilez at FC Dallas

1999 births
Living people
Mexican footballers
Mexico youth international footballers
American soccer players
United States men's youth international soccer players
American sportspeople of Mexican descent
Association football goalkeepers
FC Dallas players
Homegrown Players (MLS)
North Texas SC players
OKC Energy FC players
Soccer players from Dallas
Tormenta FC players
Chattanooga Red Wolves SC players
USL Championship players
USL League One players